The 2012–13 Hallescher FC season is the 67th season in the club's football history. In 2012–13 the club plays in the 3. Liga, the third tier of German football. It is the club's second season in this league, having been promoted from the Regionalliga in 2011.

The club also took part in the 2012–13 edition of the DFB-Pokal, the German Cup, but was knocked out in the first round by 2. Bundesliga side MSV Duisburg.

Hallescher FC also takes part in the 2012–13 edition of the Saxony-Anhalt Cup, having reached the third round after a bye in the first and a 5–0 win over 1. FC Lok Stendal in the second round, facing SV Braunsbedra next.

Review and events

Matches

Legend

3. Liga

DFB-Pokal

Squad

|}

Transfers

In

Out

Sources

External links
 2012–13 Hallescher FC season at Weltfussball.de 
 2012–13 Hallescher FC season at kicker.de 
 2012–13 Hallescher FC season at Fussballdaten.de 

Hallescher FC
Hallescher FC seasons